Lukáš Koprna (born 24 October 2003) is a Slovak footballer who plays for Slovan Bratislava juniori as a midfielder.

Club career

FK Senica
Lukáš Koprna made his Fortuna Liga debut for Senica in an away fixture against Pohronie on 11 December 2021. Koprna came on as a replacement for Giannis Niarchos in second-half stoppage time, who scored the game's sole goal in the 54th minute.

References

External links
 FK Senica official club profile 
 
 Futbalnet profile 
 

2003 births
Living people
People from Senica District
Sportspeople from the Trnava Region
Slovak footballers
Association football midfielders
FK Senica players
ŠK Slovan Bratislava players
Slovak Super Liga players
2. Liga (Slovakia) players